World Masters Golf is a golf simulation video game for the Super NES released in Europe.

Summary
This video game features four gouraud shaded courses in order to produce continuous shading of surfaces represented by polygon meshes. Modes of gameplay are: tournament, match play, and practice. There are created golfers and the option for the player to create his own. The game allows golf handicapping. Up to eight players can play. There is a Mode 7 view camera that follows the ball after it is hit. Basic information like the wind speed, distance to the flag, the number of shots required to make par on a hole, and the number of shots already made on a hole are shown while playing the game.

References

1995 video games
Europe-exclusive video games
Golf video games
Super Nintendo Entertainment System games
Super Nintendo Entertainment System-only games
Virgin Interactive games
Multiplayer and single-player video games
Video games developed in the United Kingdom
Arc Developments games